The 2006 Winter Paralympics were held in Turin, Italy, from 10 March to 19 March 2006. Approximately 486 athletes from 39 National Paralympic Committees (NPCs) participated in these Games.

The Games featured 58 medal events in 5 disciplines grouped over 4 sports. Wheelchair curling made its Paralympic debut.

Several disability classifications that were held as separate events in the 2002 Winter Paralympics were held together at the 2006 Paralympics. Competitors were given a factored time based on their real time and the level of disability of the competitor. This resulted in a decrease in the number of medals on offer.

{| id="toc" class="toc" summary="Contents"
|align="center"|Contents
|-
|
Alpine skiing
Biathlon
Cross-country skiing
|valign=top|
Ice sledge hockey
Wheelchair curling
|valign=top|
|-
|align=center colspan=3| Medal leaders       References
|}


Alpine skiing

Biathlon

Cross-country skiing

Wheelchair curling

Ice sledge hockey

Medal leaders
Athletes that won at least two gold medals or at least three total medals are listed below.

See also
List of 2006 Winter Olympics medal winners

References

Medal winners
2006 Winter Paralympics medal winners
2006 Winter Paralympics medal winners